Luci is an English feminine given name variant of Lucy and an Italian surname derived from the Latin personal name Lucius (from Latin Lux, genitive Lucis, meaning "light"). Luci is also an ancient Norman territorial surname derived from the village of Lucé (Normandy, France) arrived in England after the Norman Conquest that originated various English surnames: Luce, Lucy, Lucey. Alternative spellings and related names are: Lucia, Lucie, Lucile, Lucien, Lucey, Lucci, Luce, Lucy, Luzi.

Luci may refer to:

People

Given name
 Luci (footballer) (born 1972), Spanish football manager and former footballer
 Luci Baines Johnson (born 1947), younger daughter of U.S. President Lyndon Johnson
 Luci Christian (born 1973), American voice actress working with ADV Films and FUNimation
 Luci Pollreis, Austrian Righteous among the Nations
 Luci Romberg, American stuntwoman
 Luci Shaw (b. 1928), English poet living in the United States
 Luci Tapahonso (b. 1953), American poet
 Luci van Org, (b. 1971), German musician, writer and actress
 Luci Victoria (b. 1982), English model and actress
 Luci, a fictional female character in Barney and the Backyard Gang and Barney and Friends

Surname
 de Luci, Anglo-Norman family
 Andrea Luci (b. 1985), Italian footballer
 Anthony de Luci (1283–1343), Chief Justiciar of Ireland in 1331
 Cassandra Luci (1785–1863), Italian Princess Poniatowski
 Giovanni Luci (Johannes Lucius; 1604–1679), Dalmatian historian
 Godfrey de Luci (d. 1204), Norman bishop of Winchester
 Luciano Luci (b. 1949), Italian referee
 Luzio Luzi (16th century), Italian painter of the late Renaissance/Mannerism era born in Todi
 Mari-Luci Jaramillo (1928–2019), American-born U.S. ambassador to Honduras
 Richard de Luci (1089–1179), Norman baron, sheriff of Essex and Chief Justiciar of England
 Walter de Luci (1103 or 1091 – 1171), Norman monk, abbot of Battle Abbey

See also
 Luce (name)
 Lucey
 Luci (disambiguation)
 Lucia (disambiguation) or Lúcia
 Luciana (disambiguation)
 Lucie
 Lucifer (disambiguation)
 Lucile (disambiguation) or Lucille (disambiguation)
 Lucinda (given name)
 Lucini (disambiguation)
 Lucioni
 Lucy
 Lusi (disambiguation)
 Luzi

English given names
Latin-language surnames
Italian-language surnames
Patronymic surnames